John Womack Jr. (born August 14, 1937) is an American economist and historian of Latin America, particularly of Mexico, the Mexican Revolution (1910–1921) and Emiliano Zapata.  In June 2009 he retired from his post as the Robert Woods Bliss Professor of Latin American History and Economics at Harvard University.

Early life and education
Womack was born in Norman, Oklahoma, in 1937 to John Womack Sr., also a historian. He graduated summa cum laude from Harvard University in 1959 and became a Rhodes Scholar at Merton College, Oxford. In the 1960s he returned to Harvard to earn a PhD in history, doing research that gave him international prestige and his most notable book, Zapata and the Mexican Revolution, published in 1969.

Career

His dissertation earned him a place at Harvard as an assistant professor of Latin American History. The published monograph was nominated for a National Book Award in 1970 and he was named to the Robert Woods Bliss Chair in Latin American History, first held by Clarence Haring. Womack has focused on modern Mexican history, with interests in Cuban and Colombian history, leading research in agrarian, industrial, and labor history. After his monograph on Zapata, which inspired many other scholars to pursue projects on grassroots rural history, he shifted his focus to urban working-class history. 

In 1978, he published an article in the short-lived (1978–80) and largely unavailable journal Marxist Perspectives on the Mexican economy during the Revolution. His article in the Cambridge History of Latin America was anthologized in Mexico Since Independence. In 1999, he published an article on the Moctezuma beer brewery. In 2005, he published a long article assessing the state of labor history. His 1999 anthology of documents Rebellion in Chiapas: An Historical Reader places the Chiapas struggle in a historical perspective back to the 16th century.

On November 21, 2009, Womack received the 1808 Medal from the Mexico City government. He gave it up to the Mexican Union of Electricians, saying: "My infinite respect for the ability of Mexicans to transform in benefit of the majority their moments of crisis. Such conviction moves me to give honor and deliver this medal to the most important, most courageous organization that took form in this city during the revolutionary wars at the beginning of the last century, the Mexican Union of Electricians". 

In 2013, Adela Pineda Franco and Jaime Marroquín Arrendondo interviewed Womack about his views of the Mexican Revolution, the movie Viva Zapata, and the relevance of Zapata in modern Mexico. "In Mexico, for complicated, still largely unexamined historical reasons, the exploited classes cannot count on politicians or intellectuals for guidance to overthrow the systems of exploitation, centered in New York, proliferated into centers in Mexico, concentrated, of course in Mexico City. Like the people in Morelos, 1900-1911, the exploited have to figure out for themselves, not trusting the politicians they know whatever they howl, whatever they promise."

Personal life
Womack befriended filmmaker Terrence Malick, a fellow Oklahoma native, when they were both Rhodes Scholars, and he appeared in a brief role in Malick's 1973 film Badlands.

Womack is also the maternal grandfather of late rapper Lil Peep.

Publications 

"Doing Labor History: Feelings, Work, Material Power" in Journal of the Historical Society (2005)
 Rebellion in Chiapas: An Historical Reader (1999)
 Zapata and the Mexican Revolution Vintage (1969) 
 Zapata and the Mexican Revolution (1968)
 Oklahoma’s Green Corn Rebellion: The Importance of Fools. Harvard, senior thesis (1959)
 Emiliano Zapata and the Revolution in Morelos, 1910-1920. Harvard, Ph.D. dissertation (1966)
 The Revolution That Wasn't: Mexico, 1910-1920 The New Press, 2011.

References

External links
  John Womack at Harvard's History department
 John Womack articles at the New York Review of Books
 About FFIPP

1937 births
Living people
20th-century American historians
20th-century American male writers
21st-century American historians
21st-century American male writers
Alumni of Merton College, Oxford
American Marxist historians
American male non-fiction writers
Harvard College alumni
Harvard Graduate School of Arts and Sciences alumni
Harvard University faculty
Historians of Latin America
Historians of Mexico
Latin Americanists
People from Norman, Oklahoma